Nearly Eighteen is a 1943 American comedy film directed by Arthur Dreifuss and written by George Wallace Sayre. The film stars Gale Storm, Rick Vallin, William Henry, Luis Alberni, Ralph Hodges and Jerry Rush. The film was released on November 12, 1943, by Monogram Pictures.

Plot
Jane 'Janie' Stanton (Gale Storm) on the verge of turning 18 finds that she can't afford the tuition to attend a "renowned singing and dancing school".  In an effort to realize her dreams Stanton devises a plan to take advantage of an age related loophole.  She discovers  that the school will offer enrolment free of charge if a student is under the age of 15.  Stanton goes about transforming herself into a much younger student in order to attend the school.

Cast          
Gale Storm as Jane Stanton
Rick Vallin as Tony Morgan
William Henry as Jack Leonard 
Luis Alberni as Gus
Ralph Hodges as Tom
Jerry Rush as Dick
George O'Hanlon as Eddie
Bebe Fox as Harriet
Robert Homans as Judge
Sarah Edwards as Miss Perkins
Kenneth Harlan as Sammy Klein
Donald Kerr as Harry

References

External links
 

1943 films
American comedy films
1943 comedy films
Monogram Pictures films
Films directed by Arthur Dreifuss
American black-and-white films
1940s English-language films
1940s American films